The Division of Spence is an electoral district for the Australian House of Representatives. It is located in the outer northern suburbs of Adelaide in South Australia.

Geography
Federal electoral division boundaries in Australia are determined at redistributions by a redistribution committee appointed by the Australian Electoral Commission. Redistributions occur for the boundaries of divisions in a particular state, and they occur every seven years, or sooner if a state's representation entitlement changes or when divisions of a state are malapportioned.

History

It is named in honour of Catherine Helen Spence, an advocate for female suffrage and electoral reform and the first female political candidate in Australia.

Spence was created in the electoral redistribution that concluded in July 2018 as a replacement for the Division of Wakefield. It is essentially the more urbanised southern portion of the formerly hybrid urban-rural Wakefield. The Division of Port Adelaide was abolished after South Australia was reduced from 11 electorates to ten, resulting in quite large movements of the remaining divisions' boundaries to fill in the gap.

The geographic extent of Spence is approximately the Adelaide Plains between the Little Para River in the south and the Gawler River on the north, plus areas around Gawler and Salisbury. It includes all of the City of Playford and Town of Gawler; along with Concordia and Kalbeeba from the Barossa Council, and Gawler Belt and Buchfelde from Light Regional Council on the outskirts of Gawler. Spence also includes six suburbs in the City of Salisbury south of the Little Para River but west and north of Main North Road and Kings Road. Spence overlaps the final configuration of Bonython before it was abolished prior to the 2004 election and much of it was merged with what had been the southern part of Wakefield. Spence extends further east, west and north than Bonython at the time of its abolition, but Wakefield had historically been a rural seat until 2004.

Spence was notionally a comfortably safe Labor seat with a notional Labor margin of 17.9 percent, making it on paper the safest Labor seat in the state. By comparison, the abolished Wakefield finished with a safe Labor margin of 11.0 percent. Champion retained it in 2019 with only a small swing against him. Spence is still the safest Labor seat in the state, with a 14.1 percent swing needed for the Liberals to win it.

Members

Election results

References

Electoral divisions of Australia
Constituencies established in 2019
2019 establishments in Australia